A New Day at Midnight is the sixth studio album by British singer-songwriter David Gray, released on 28 October 2002 in the UK by East West Records and IHT Records and November 5, 2002 in the United States by the former RCA imprint ATO Records and iht as well. The album entered the UK Albums Chart at No. 1 upon its opening week, and spent a total of 49 weeks on the chart.

Two singles were released from A New Day at Midnight: "The Other Side" in December 2002, and "Be Mine" in April 2003. "Dead in the Water" was released as a promo-only single in November 2002. Both singles failed to break into the top 20 of the UK Singles Chart, peaking at No. 35 and No. 23 respectively. The album received critically mixed reviews, but went on to be certified platinum four times.

The album is dedicated to David Gray's father, Peter, who died of cancer in 2001, at the height of Gray's popularity. A song titled "A New Day at Midnight", written about the birth of Gray's first daughter, Ivy, was written during the album's sessions but was not included on the album.

Track listing

Personnel

Musicians
 All instrumentation by David Gray and Craig McClune
 Tony Shanaghan – backing vocals on "Caroline", "Kangaroo" and "Easy Way to Cry"
 Rob Malone – bass guitar on "Caroline", "Long Distance Call", "Freedom", "Last Boat to America", "Real Love", "Knowhere" and "Easy Way to Cry"
 Tim Bradshaw – piano on "Real Love" and "Easy Way to Cry", Wurlitzer on "Long Distance Call", electric guitar on "Freedom", lap steel on "Last Boat to America", drone keys on "Knowhere", backwards synth on "December"
 B. J. Cole – pedal steel on "Caroline"
 Wrecking Crew – orchestra on "Long Distance Call", brass on "Freedom", string quartet on "Easy Way to Cry"

Production
 Produced by David Gray, Iestyn Polson, and Craig McClune
 Mixed by Fred Defaye and Simon Changer
 Recorded and programmed by Iestyn Polson
 Mastered by George Marino
 Compiled by Dave Turner and Gus Shaw

Charts

Weekly charts

Year-end charts

Certifications

References

2002 albums
David Gray (musician) albums
East West Records albums
ATO Records albums
Albums produced by Iestyn Polson